Danson Tang is a Taiwanese model, actor and singer, who started his career as a commercial model before pursuing an acting career and later singing. He was previously under management to Gala Television for his acting projects and Avex Taiwan for his music career. He is currently contracted to Eternity Entertainment Corporation and managed by Comprise Boundless Entertainment ).
He studied at Hsing Wu University majoring in English.  Tang is able to converse in English, Mandarin Chinese and simple Cantonese due to previously working in Hong Kong.

Early life
Danson Tang was born on 2 September 1984 in Keelung, Taiwan. The youngest of a two-child family, he has a sister four years older than him. At age fourteen his father suddenly died due to a work accident which left his mother to care for his sister and him alone. To make a living and pay for his sister's overseas education his mother had to leave home to find employment which left young Danson living alone at home. Occasionally relatives and neighbors would drop by to check in on him to make sure he was doing well. He has said the experience of being alone has left him hard to open up to others about his feelings.

Career

Pre-debut
Tang was discovered while working part-time at a Japanese restaurant during his college years.  His career started out as a commercial model and appearing on other artistes music videos. Some of his more popular early work included appearing in two music videos for Hong Kong pop duo Twins during the height of their popularity.

Acting
After gaining recognition through his commercial work Tang was contacted by Taiwanese television station GTV for an acting management contract. After reviewing his new career endeavor with his mother he signed with GTV in 2004 to act in dramas that aired on their network. At first appearing only in minor supporting roles he eventually moved up to main cast roles when he was cast as the villain in 2005 popular idol drama KO One starring opposite Taiwanese boy band Fahrenheit members. He continued his collaboration with the group and their acting management company "Comic International Productions" in idol dramas such as Hanazakarino Kimitachihe, The X-Family, They Kiss Again and Rolling Love.

Originally cast as the main lead in Mysterious Incredible Terminator, the drama production company later switched his role with Fahrenheit member Aaron Yan , which Tang ended up starring as the second male lead in Rolling Love due to Yan's leg injury. With Rolling Love subpar ratings, feeling overshadowed and under promoted by his acting management company he eventually left GTV's management in 2011 and signed with Comprise Boundless Entertainment.

After leaving GTV he continued with main supporting roles in Mainland produced dramas. In 2012 Tang landed his first leading role in a major production for newly formed Hong Kong television network HKTV, starring in the idol drama Love in Time playing a 200-year-old vampire who falls in love with a human girl. Tang who is not fluent in Cantonese, voice was dubbed over by a voice actor. However, as of current the drama remains un-aired and does not have a set schedule of when it will air due to HKTV unavailability to obtain a free television programme service licence from the Hong Kong government.

In 2013 Tang returned to Taiwan produced dramas by signing an acting contract with local cable station SETTV. His first drama with SETTV was as the second male lead in A Hint of You. The following year he was cast as the male lead in SETTV's weekly drama Fabulous 30. With strong ratings from Fabulous 30, he was once again offered a leading role by SETTV for their 2015 Friday night drama Murphy's Law of Love. Then in 2017, Tang scored a supporting role as Bai Zhou in Chinese drama, Our Boyhood (我们的少年时代), which starred the famous idol boy band, TFBOYS. Tang also had sung the song in 我们的少年时代, 再见安打.

Music
On 9 July 2007, Danson is sign by Avex Taiwan and released his debut solo album Love Me on 17 August 2007. This was followed by D's New Attraction in 2009 and The First Second in 2010. He is to release his first new song plus collection compilation album, Towards Tomorrow's Journey on 26 April 2011, in two versions, Guardian Edition and Journey Edition. It will contain 15 previously released tracks and three new songs, including lead track "Towards Tomorrow's Journey".

Personal life
Tang became close friends with Fahrenheit member Jiro Wang after many collaborations and also sharing the same birth sign. The two have said they enjoyed shopping for clothes and accessories together during their days off.

During his collaboration days with Fahrenheit he was often mistaken as a member of the band.

In 2008 Danson became an uncle when his older sister gave birth to a daughter named Maiya. Tang has said he often spoils his niece by buying items for her.

Filmography

Television series

Movies

Discography

Studio

Compilation

Soundtrack contributions

Music videos appearances
*Self MV's

*Other artistes MV's

Books
 4 December 2007: Danson Tang Photo Novel Tang Yu Zhe Ying Zi Shu – 
 15 April 2008: Danson Tang Photo and Writing Collection – 
 8 December 2010: DisPLAY DANSON TANG – 
 21 March 2012: In the Land of the Sacred and Love Danson Tang() –

Awards and nominations

References

External links
  Danson Tang@Avex Taiwan official homepage
  Danson Tang discography@Avex Taiwan
  Comprise Boundless Entertainment blog
  Danson's Sina blog
  Danson Tang Facebook page
  Danson Tang Weibo page
  Danson Tang Instagram page

1984 births
Living people
Taiwanese male television actors
Taiwanese Mandopop singers
Male actors from Keelung
21st-century Taiwanese singers
Hsing Wu University alumni
Musicians from Keelung